New Harmony's Atheneum is the visitor center for New Harmony, Indiana.  It is named for the Greek Athenaion, which was a temple dedicated to Athena in ancient Greece. Funded by the Indianapolis Lilly Endowment in 1976, with the help of the Krannert Charitable Trust, it was opened on October 10, 1979.

The architect was Richard Meier, whose other works include the Getty Center in Los Angeles, California. When it opened in 1979 it won a Progressive Architecture Award, and in 1982 won an American Institute of Architects (AIA) Honor Award. In 2008 it won the AIA's prestigious Twenty-five Year Award, which is given to no more than one building per year.  Architect Peter Eisenman nominated the Atheneum for this award 
because it was "a wonderfully pure example of the recurring themes among (Meier's) substantial oeuvre; it is a classic 'Meier' design."

The Atheneum is designed so that visitors have to go a specific way through the building, leading out into New Harmony itself. The three-story building's ramp and overlaying grids provide frequent views of the town and countryside.

As a visitor's center for New Harmony, it includes a 17-minute movie on the history of New Harmony, called "The New Harmony Experience", in its 200-seat auditorium.  There are four galleries.  The first hosts a gift shop and a 1/32 scale copy of the Harmonist Brick Church.  The second galleries discusses the various individuals in New Harmony's history.  The third gallery has a 1 inch = 10 feet (1:120) scale of New Harmony in 1824, made during the filming of the movie.  The fourth is closed to the public and has furniture designed by Richard Meier himself.

Tours of Historic New Harmony, a collection of buildings of historical significance administered by the Indiana State Historic Site system, begin at the Atheneum.

References

External links
 New Harmony's Atheneum wins award Louisville Courier-Journal December 23, 2007.
Historic New Harmony Historic New Harmony is a unified program of the University of Southern Indiana and the Indiana State Museum and Historic Sites.

Buildings and structures completed in 1979
Buildings and structures in Posey County, Indiana
New Harmony, Indiana
Richard Meier buildings
Event venues established in 1979
Tourist attractions in Posey County, Indiana
1979 establishments in Indiana